HC ATK (Armádní tělovýchovný klub) Praha, founded in 1948, was an ice hockey team in Czechoslovakia.  It won the Czechoslovak First Ice Hockey League title in the 1949–50 season and played in the league for a total of eight seasons. The club also celebrated second and third placed league finishes. The club changed its name to ÚDA (Ústřední dům armády) Praha ahead of the 1953/54 season and ceased operations in 1956.

Team success
 Czechoslovak Extraliga
1st place (1950)
2nd place (1952)
3rd place (1949)

References

Ice hockey teams in Czechoslovakia
Military ice hockey teams
Ice Hockey
Ice hockey clubs established in 1948
1948 establishments in Czechoslovakia
1956 disestablishments in Czechoslovakia
Sports clubs disestablished in 1956
Sport in Prague